Avry Holmes (born February 20, 1994) is an American professional basketball player for the Halcones de Xalapa of the Liga Nacional de Baloncesto Profesional (LNBP). He was drafted 66th overall by the Santa Cruz Warriors in the 2017 NBA G-League draft.

Holmes starred at North Salem High School. He was named second-team all-state as a junior and first-team all-state as a senior.

Holmes played two seasons for San Francisco and averaged 12.5 points and 3.1 assists per game as a sophomore. In May 2014, he announced he was transferring to Clemson. He averaged 10 points per game as a junior and started all 31 contests. As a senior at Clemson, Holmes averaged 10.3 points, 2.4 rebounds, and 1.3 assists per game.

On September 26, 2017, Holmes was signed by Panionios in Greece.

Holmes was selected in the third round of the 2017 NBA G League draft by the Santa Cruz Warriors and signed with the team. In his first season for Santa Cruz, he averaged 6.2 points and 1.6 assists per game.

In October 2018 he was traded to the Agua Caliente Clippers of the G League for a 3rd round pick. He was placed on waivers on November 1.

Holmes joined Mexican team Soles de Mexicali in December 2018.

Holmes spent the 2019–20 season in Mexico with Aguacateros de Michoacán. On September 2, 2021, he signed with Astros de Jalisco.

References

External links
 Avry Holmes G-League Stats at Basketball-Reference.com
 Avry Holmes profile at RealGM

1994 births
Living people
Aguacateros de Michoacán players
American expatriate basketball people in Greece
American expatriate basketball people in Mexico
Astros de Jalisco players
Basketball players from Oregon
Clemson Tigers men's basketball players
Halcones de Xalapa players
Panionios B.C. players
Point guards
San Francisco Dons men's basketball players
Santa Cruz Warriors players
Soles de Mexicali players
Sportspeople from Salem, Oregon
American men's basketball players